David Murray, 2nd Earl of Mansfield, 7th Viscount of Stormont,  (9 October 1727 – 1 September 1796), known as the (7th) Viscount of Stormont from 1748 to 1793, was a British politician.  He succeeded to both the Mansfield and Stormont lines of the Murray family, inheriting two titles and two fortunes.

Background

Mansfield was the son of David Murray, 6th Viscount of Stormont, and his wife, Anne Stewart. Lord Chief Justice William Murray, 1st Earl of Mansfield, was his paternal uncle. Viscount Stormont ancestral seat is Scone Palace.

Public life
Mansfield was ambassador to Warsaw, Vienna and then to France in the early years of the American War of Independence, and played a role in sending news of American actions back to England. He had been elected a Scottish Representative Peer in 1754.

The great antiquarian Winckelmann (whom he met in Rome in 1768) remarked that the Viscount was " the most learned man of his rank whom I have yet known "

When King Frederick II of Prussia invaded Saxony, The Elector of Saxony was forced to retreat to his Polish Kingdom, Mansfield followed and in Warsaw he met his first wife Henrietta Frederica von Bünau, daughter of Count Henreich Graf von Bünau, in 1759 the couple were married. Then Mansfield was appointed British Ambassador to Austria in 1763 to 1772 at the court of Empress Maria Theresa, followed by ambassador to Paris from 1772 to March 1778. In France, he met Queen Marie Antoinette, whom he had acquinted back when she was a little archduchess in the court of her mother in Vienna years prior, The Queen of France was very pleased to be greeted by a friendly face and befriended The Viscount, to commemorate their friendship, she gifted him one of three Jean Henri Riesener writing desks previously commissioned to mark her marriage. Marie Antoinette nicknamed him "le bel Anglais" meaning the beautiful English.In 1774, his uncle the first Earl stayed at the Embassy and Lord Stormont presented his uncle to Louis XVI and Marie-Antionette at Versailles. 

then he was appointed as the last Secretary of State for the Northern Department, serving from 1779 to 1782.

In 1783 he was appointed as Lord President of the Council, and again from 1794 to 1796. He served as Lord Justice General between 1778 and 1795. He was appointed a Privy Counsellor in 1763 and made a Knight of the Thistle in 1768.

Family

Lord Stormont, as he was known at the time, married his wife on 16 August 1759, whilst he was British ambassador to Saxony. She was Countess Henrietta Frederica von Bünau daughter of Count Henreich Graf von Bünau. They had two daughters:
 Lady Elizabeth Murray (18 May 1760 – 1 June 1825); married George Finch-Hatton and had issue, including George Finch-Hatton, 10th Earl of Winchilsea.
 Hon. Henrietta Anne Murray (16 October 1764, Dresden – circa 1765, Vienna)

Henrietta died on 10 March 1766. A decade later, on 5 May 1776, Mansfield married secondly The Hon. Louisa Cathcart, daughter of Charles Cathcart, 9th Lord Cathcart. Louisa was his junior by more than 30 years, and they had five children:
 David William Murray, 3rd Earl of Mansfield (1777–1840)
 Lieutenant-general The Hon. George Murray (1780–1848)
 Major The Hon. Charles Murray (1781–1859), who married Elizabeth Law and had children
 General Sir Henry Murray (1784–1860), who married Emily, daughter of Gerard de Vismé, and had children.
 Lady Caroline Murray (died 1867)

In 1793 he succeeded his uncle, Lord Mansfield, as the 2nd Earl of Mansfield of the 1792 creation, while his wife succeeded as second Countess of Mansfield of the 1776 creation, according to special remainders in the letters patent. From the 1st Earl he inherited Kenwood House in the London Borough of Camden.

Lord Mansfield died in September 1796 and his body laid to rest with his uncle, the 1st Earl, in Westminster Abbey. His heart was interred in Comlongon Castle. He was succeeded in his titles and to Kenwood House by his eldest son David. His second son, the Honourable George Murray, became a Lieutenant-General in the Army. His fourth son, the Honourable Sir Henry Murray, rose to the rank of General.

The Countess of Mansfield survived her husband by 47 years. She went on to marry her first cousin the Honourable Robert Fulke Greville in 1797. Lady Mansfield died in July 1843, aged 85.

Representation in Media 

 Peter Hudson played Lord Stormont in BBC TV series Marie Antoinette (2022)

See also
 William Eden, 1st Baron Auckland
 Jean-Charles-Pierre Lenoir

References

Kidd, Charles, Williamson, David (editors). Debrett's Peerage and Baronetage (1990 edition). New York: St Martin's Press, 1990, 
 Tugdual de Langlais, L'armateur préféré de Beaumarchais Jean Peltier Dudoyer, de Nantes à l'Isle de France, Éd. Coiffard, 2015, 340 p..

Further reading
 

1727 births
1796 deaths
David
Diplomatic peers
2
Lord Presidents of the Council
Lords Justice-General
Members of the Privy Council of Great Britain
Scottish representative peers
Secretaries of State for the Northern Department
Ambassadors of Great Britain to France
Ambassadors of Great Britain to Poland
Dunbar, David Murray, 2nd Earl of
Ambassadors of Great Britain to the Holy Roman Emperor
18th-century British politicians
Leaders of the House of Lords
Burials at Westminster Abbey